Stratton Finance is one of Australia's largest car and asset finance brokers, with offices in most Australian capital cities and a national network of franchises.

Stratton Finance offers business and personal finance for a range of different types of assets including cars, boats and caravans, truck and heavy vehicles, business equipment and machinery as well as a range of insurance products. Stratton Finance has served over 100,000 Australians since 1998 with their asset finance, and has a staff of over 200 people Australia wide.

Stratton Finance is an Australian Finance Broker, accredited by over 50 lenders and insurers, some with exclusive agency.

History

Stratton Finance was first established by Rob Chaloner in 1998 as a specialist motor finance broker. The business initially relied on referrals from a Melbourne-based Land Rover dealership, but rapidly began attracting word of mouth referrals and a number of finance consultants were employed to meet the growing demand.

In 2002, Stratton Finance launched www.strattonfinance.com.au, and in 2009 launched the first Stratton Finance franchise. In 2014, Stratton Finance became part of the Carsales network when Carsales.com Ltd bought a 50.1% share in the business. In 2015, Stratton Finance acquired All About Finance, which became its marine & leisure division. In 2019 Carsales announced its intended divestment of the business, and in 2020, a team led by Founder Rob Chaloner acquired Carsales Ltd's shareholding.

Stratton Finance was announced best loan provider and car loan provider for 2023, achieving the honor three years in a row, and establishing the business as one of the leading car and asset brokers in Australia.

Products and services

As a finance broker, Stratton Finance offers clients a range of finance products, including Finance lease, Commercial Hire Purchase, Chattel mortgage, Novated lease, Fully Maintained Novated Lease, Consumer Loan and Personal Loans. While predominantly focused on vehicle finance and insurance, Stratton Finance also offers finance for a range of different types of assets, including cars, boats and caravans, truck and heavy vehicles, business equipment and machinery.

Additionally, in 2012 Stratton Finance invested in its new car buying service, carconnect, utilising a national dealer network to source vehicles for customers at fleet prices.

Stratton Finance consultants and accredited franchisees represent over 30 finance companies, including major lenders Alphera Financial Services, Macquarie Leasing, Esanda (ANZ), Commonwealth Bank of Australia (CBA), GE Money, and Liberty Financial Services.

Franchising program

Stratton Finance has company-owned offices in Melbourne, Sydney, and Brisbane, and a franchise network which operates in metropolitan and regional areas around Australia.
 
The franchise program provides independent finance brokers with the opportunity to develop their own local business with the support and recognition of a large, established industry brand and reputation.

Franchisees are provided with a complete franchise system, including finance leads, access to a range of finance and insurance products and access to Stratton Finance's proprietary IT capability.

The franchise program, launched in 2009, now includes 20 offices nationwide.

Licences and professional memberships

Stratton Finance (and related group companies) hold an Australian Credit Licence (364340), is a Licensed Motor Car Trader (10697) and is a member of several professional and industry organisations that provide consumer protection and industry guidelines and standards.

Stratton Finance is an accredited member of the FBAA (103514), the Franchise Council of Australia and a Credit Ombudsman Service Limited (COSL) member (408706).

References

External links
Stratton Finance Website

Financial services companies of Australia